Kaly is a municipality and village in Brno-Country District in the South Moravian Region of the Czech Republic. It has about 300 inhabitants.

Administrative parts
The village of Zahrada is an administrative part of Kaly.

References

Villages in Brno-Country District